Peter Brown (born 16 December 1941) is a former Scotland international rugby union player. He played No. 8 and Lock.

Rugby Union career

Amateur career

Brown played for West of Scotland and Gala.

Brown was dubbed "the man on the coathanger" in his playing days because of his unusually square shoulders inherited from his maternal grandmother's side of the family. He kicked many goals which is very unusual for a forward.

Provincial career

Brown played for Glasgow District.

International career

Brown captained Scotland 10 times in his 27 internationals (1964–73). He is unique in captaining Scotland to 3 victories over England and his 67 international points making him Scotland's all time highest scoring rugby forward.

Administrative career

Brown was an independent member of Scottish Rugby's discipline panel and acted as a match and discipline commissioner for both the RBS Six Nations and the Heineken European Cup.

Business career

Brown was chairman of the Scottish Building Society from 1993–2003. From 1975 till 2004 he was senior partner in Hogg Thorburn, chartered accountants, in Galashiels and was a non-executive director with Edinburgh Risk Management (General) Limited, insurance brokers.

Now retired from chartered accountancy, an outstandingly entertaining public speaker, he teaches public speaking and meeting presentation skills. In his involvement as a Trustee with the Scottish Borders employment charity WORKS+ mentors young adults in the basics of performance at interview. In addition he is an accomplished photographer, in 2014 published a luxury book of the Muirfield members and their guests enjoying the 2013 Open.

Family

Brown is the elder brother of the late Gordon Brown, the son of footballer John Brown, and the nephew of footballers Tom and Jim Brown.

References

Sources

 Massie, Allan A Portrait of Scottish Rugby (Polygon, Edinburgh)

External links
Peter Brown on the Sporting Heroes website

1941 births
Living people
Gala RFC players
Glasgow District (rugby union) players
Rugby union players from Troon
Scotland international rugby union players
Scottish rugby union players
West of Scotland FC players
Rugby union number eights